A leadership election was held on 12 November and 19 November 2017 by the centre-left political parties of Greece, with the participation of Panhellenic Socialist Movement (PASOK), Greece's main centre-left party and The River (Potami), another parliamentary party. The Movement of Democratic Socialists (KIDISO) and the Union of Democratic National Reform movement (EDEM) also supported the elections. The first round of election was held on 12 November. No candidate gained 50% of the votes, so a runoff vote was held on 19 November. The elections were regulated by an election committee under the presidency of Nikos Alivizatos.

More than 210,000 Greek citizens voted in the first round of elections. Mass media describes the elections as important in the current political situation, and as step for the formation of a new unified party of the centre-left.

Candidates 

Nine candidates took part in the elections. In addition to Fofi Gennimata, incumbent leader of PASOK and Potami founder Stavros Theodorakis, the candidates were PASOK MEP Nikos Androulakis, Athens Mayor Giorgos Kaminis, former PASOK ministers Yiannis Maniatis and Yiannis Ragousis, the leader of the EDEM, Apostolos Pontas, the former dean of the Athens University of Economics and Business, Constantinos Gatsios, and Dimitris Tziotis.

Each candidate submitted the 1,000 signatures required for their candidacy to be confirmed.

Odysseas Konstantinopoulos was self-nominated but later retired due to health issues.

Debates 
Two televised debates were held for the leadership candidates: The first on 30 October 2017, and the second on 6 November. Both were broadcast live by the national network of the public ERT2.

Results

First round 
Temportary results showed Fofi Gennimata, leader of PASOK to be ahead with 45% of the votes while Androulakis received 24%. On 175,565 votes out of 210,264 total, F. Gennimata received 42.5% while N. Androulakis 25.14%, G. Kaminis 13.52%, S. Theorodakis 9.81%, G. Maniatis 4.26%, G. Ragkousis 2.29%, C. Gatsios 1.65%, A. Pontas 0.53%, D. Tsiotis 0.20%.

The candidates reaching the second-round election were Gennimata, with 44.5% of the vote, and Androulakis, with 25.4%.

Run-off 
The run-off on 19 November was won by Gennimata, who garnered 56% of the vote.

See also 
 PASOK leadership election (disambiguation)

References 

2017 in Greece
2017 in Greek politics
Political party leadership elections in Greece
PASOK
Greek centre-left leadership election